Annovka is a rural locality (a selo) and the administrative center of Annovskoye Rural Settlement, Bobrovsky District, Voronezh Oblast, Russia. The population was 543 as of 2010. There are 4 streets.

Geography 
Annovka is located 29 km southeast of Bobrov (the district's administrative centre) by road. Semyono-Aleksandrovka is the nearest rural locality.

References 

Rural localities in Bobrovsky District